Bleaberry Fell is a fell in the Lake District in Cumbria, England, with a height of 590 metres (1,936 feet). It stands on the main watershed between Borrowdale and Thirlmere and can be climbed from either flank. Walla Crag is a subsidiary top of Bleaberry Fell.

Topography
Situated in the central area of the national park, four kilometres (2½ miles) south of Keswick, Bleaberry Fell is the northernmost top on the ridge that separates the valleys containing the lakes of Derwent Water (Borrowdale) and Thirlmere. This ridge, which also contains the fells of High Seat and High Tove, is notoriously boggy underfoot, but Bleaberry Fell is mostly dry and the heather-covered summit gives an excellent all-round vista. To the east the fell has the rock faces of Iron Crag and Goat Crags as it falls away towards the Thirlmere valley.

Ascents
The fell is usually climbed from the car park in Great Wood in Borrowdale, firstly ascending Walla Crag via Cat Gill and then continuing south-easterly for two kilometres (1¼ miles) to Bleaberry Fell which is clearly in view. The fell can also be climbed from Keswick, an 11-kilometre (7-mile) round trip, again going by Walla Crag. Walla Crag is in fact part of Bleaberry Fell, being the outlying north western crags, but is given the status of a separate fell by Lake District writers due to its excellent views and popularity.

Another possible starting point is the hamlet of Dale Bottom on the main Keswick to Ambleside road. It is possible to continue from Bleaberry Fell southerly along the ridge to take in the other Wainwright fells of High Seat and High Tove following a line of old fenceposts. This ridge is very boggy.

Geology
The summit of the fell is representative of the Birker Fell Formation. This is composed of plagioclase-phyric andesite lavas and subordinate sills. To the south en route to High Seat are garnet-bearing porphyric andesite. Much of the northern section is overlain by peat and till.

Summit
The top is heather-clad and carries a number of cairns. Bleaberry Fell's central position is rewarded by a fine all-round view, all of the major fell groups being visible. Derwentwater can be brought into sight by moving to the north-west cairn.

References

Fells of the Lake District